This is a list of films produced by the Ollywood film industry based in Bhubaneshwar and Cuttack in 1986:

A-Z

References

1986
Ollywood
Films, Ollywood